The Szapolyai or Zápolya family was a noble family in the Kingdom of Hungary in the second half of the 15th century and in the early 16th century. A member of the family, John Szapolyai, was King of Hungary between 1526 and 1540, but he only ruled the central and eastern parts of the kingdom, because many Hungarian lords and prelates supported his opponent, Ferdinand of Habsburg.

Origins 

The first known member of the family was one Ladislaus Vajdafi Szapolyai, who was a Slavonian nobleman with estates in former Požega County. Most notably the today small eponymous village Zapolje in Rešetari municipality, Brod-Posavina county.

His eldest son, Emeric, was the first member of the family to achieve the status of "true baron of the realm" when Matthias Corvinus, King of Hungary, appointed him high treasurer in 1459 or 1460. The sudden emergence of Emeric and his two brothersNicholas and Stephenduring Matthias Corvinus's reign gave rise to scholarly theories about their kinship with the royal Hunyadi family. The joint appearance of the Szapolyai, Hunyadi and Szilágyi coat-of-arms in certain places also support this theory, taking into account that Matthias Corvinus's mother was Elizabeth Szilágyi. The Szapolyai coat-of-arms (which depicted a wolf) appears together with the Hunyadi coat-of-arms on the tomb of Matthias Corvinus's father, John Hunyadi, and with the Hunyadi and Szilágyi coat-of-arms in the Dominican monastery in Buda and on a well in Matthias Corvinus's summer palace in Visegrád. According to one theory, John Hunyadi's mother was born to the Szapolyai family; according to a concurring scholarly view, Emeric Szapolyai was Matthias Corvinus's half-brother. None of the theories can be proven, because no member of the Szapolyai family referred to his kinship with the Hunyadis.

Notable members 
Emeric Zápolya
Stephen Zápolya
George Zápolya
Barbara Zápolya, Queen of Poland
John Zápolya, King of Hungary
John Sigismund Zápolya, King of Hungary and Prince of Transylvania

See also
List of titled noble families in the Kingdom of Hungary

References

Sources